IWU is an initialism that may refer to:
Illinois Wesleyan University
Indiana Wesleyan University
Independent Workers Union of Ireland
Irish Writers' Union